The Trypetheliales are an order of fungi in the class Dothideomycetes. Most of the species in the order form lichens, although some are lichenicolous fungi. Trypetheliales contains two families, Polycoccaceae and Trypetheliaceae. The order was circumscribed in 2008 by lichenologists Robert Lücking, André Aptroot, and Harrie Sipman.

Families and genera
, Species Fungorum accepts 2 families, 25 genera, and 478 species in the Trypetheliales.
Polycoccaceae 
Clypeococcum – ca. 10 spp.
Polycoccum – ca. 60 spp.

Trypetheliaceae 
Alloarthopyrenia – 1 sp.
Aptrootia – 3 spp.
Architrypethelium – 8 spp.
Astrothelium – ca. 275 spp.
Bathelium – 16 spp.
Bogoriella – 29 spp.
Buscalionia – 1 sp.
Constrictolumina – 9 spp.
Dictyomeridium – 7 spp.
Distothelia – 3 spp.
Laurera – 2 spp.
Marcelaria – 3 spp.
Musaespora – 2 spp.
Mycomicrothelia – 8 spp.
Nigrovothelium – 3 spp.
Novomicrothelia – 1 sp.
Polymeridium – 51 spp.
Polypyrenula – 1 sp.
Pseudopyrenula – 21 spp.
Trypethelium – 16 spp.
Viridothelium – 11 spp.

References

Ascomycota orders
Lichen orders
Taxa described in 2008
Taxa named by André Aptroot
Taxa named by Robert Lücking
Taxa named by Harrie Sipman